Mayfield is a city in Sumner County, Kansas, United States.  As of the 2020 census, the population of the city was 75.

History
The first post office in Mayfield was established in 1880.

Geography
Mayfield is located at  (37.262336, -97.546881).

Demographics

2010 census
As of the census of 2010, there were 113 people, 45 households, and 34 families residing in the city. The racial makeup of the city was 99.1% White and 0.9% Asian. Hispanic or Latino of any race were 1.8% of the population.

There were 45 households, of which 31.1% had children under the age of 18 living with them, 64.4% were married couples living together, 8.9% had a female householder with no husband present, 2.2% had a male householder with no wife present, and 24.4% were non-families. 24.4% of all households were made up of individuals, and 13.3% had someone living alone who was 65 years of age or older. The average household size was 2.51 and the average family size was 3.00.

The median age in the city was 42.8 years. 27.4% of residents were under the age of 18; 5.2% were between the ages of 18 and 24; 19.5% were from 25 to 44; 29.1% were from 45 to 64; and 18.6% were 65 years of age or older. The gender makeup of the city was 42.5% male and 57.5% female.

2000 census
As of the census of 2000, there were 113 people, 48 households, and 39 families residing in the city. The racial makeup of the city was 95.58% White, 1.77% Asian, and 2.65% from two or more races. Hispanic or Latino of any race were 1.77% of the population.

There were 48 households, out of which 25.0% had children under the age of 18 living with them, 70.8% were married couples living together, 8.3% had a female householder with no husband present, and 18.8% were non-families. 16.7% of all households were made up of individuals, and 6.3% had someone living alone who was 65 years of age or older. The average household size was 2.35 and the average family size was 2.64.

In the city, the population was spread out, with 20.4% under the age of 18, 3.5% from 18 to 24, 28.3% from 25 to 44, 26.5% from 45 to 64, and 21.2% who were 65 years of age or older. The median age was 44 years. For every 100 females, there were 101.8 males. For every 100 females age 18 and over, there were 87.5 males.

The median income for a household in the city was $40,417, and the median income for a family was $45,625. Males had a median income of $41,250 versus $24,500 for females. The per capita income for the city was $18,399. There were 7.3% of families and 4.1% of the population living below the poverty line, including no under eighteens and none of those over 64.

Area attractions
 Chisholm Trail Marker

Education
The community is served by Wellington USD 353 public school district.

References

Further reading

External links
 Mayfield - Directory of Public Officials
 , from Hatteberg's People on KAKE TV news
 Sumner County map, KDOT

Cities in Kansas
Cities in Sumner County, Kansas
Wichita, KS Metropolitan Statistical Area